Women in comedy refers to women who participate in comedic works as well as their experience within the social environment. While primarily dominated by men throughout history, women have been represented in the field of comedy since the mid 1700s. Comedy, or creative works with the intention of humor, is thought to have originated in ancient Greek theatre in 425 BCE.  Some of the first figures to enter the field, however, were faced with resistance and discrimination. A sense of humor in women was previously thought to have meant the ability to laugh at a man's joke, rather than tell the joke herself. When women did finally enter comedy (in its various forms), it was seen as niche, thus making bookings hard to come by.

Early acts were often based in the standard roles of women as a housewife and mother. Comedy was tailored to what men would find to be both funny and non-threatening. As women gained slow acceptance to their presence in comedy, they were able to expand the topics that they covered. Since then, women have made significant gains in the field, having found fame through stand-up, television, movies, and writing. Women such as Phyllis Diller, Wanda Sykes, Gina Barreca and many others have contributed to the world of comedy, spanning both time and medium.

As comedic license has grown, comedy has become a tool within the scope of feminism. By reclaiming a previously male-exclusive art form, feminist comedians are able to use the traditionally-male art of comedy to critique what they view as patriarchal structures. Today, feminist comedy draws attention to female issues such as menstruation, rape, gender inequality, beauty norms, and machismo. As a readily acceptable and understandable medium of communication, comedy lends itself to the feminist movement, allowing women's issues to be more wide-spread in general society.

Comedic forms

Stand-up
Stand-up comedy is a form of comedy in which performers act in front of a live audience, creating an interactive dependency. Jokes range from short one-liners to longer monologues. The comedic form requires a takeover the stage, in order for the comedian's material to "kill." For women, the direct contact with the audience puts their womanhood on display. Many female comedians choose to wear loose-fitting clothing to take their femininity out of the spotlight.

Late night television

American late night television (The Tonight Show, The Daily Show etc...) has been dominated by white men for almost its entire existence. With the exception of Full Frontal with Samantha Bee, no woman has had a late night show on a major network of her own. The platform allows a variety of comedic  (monologues and shorts) and political (interviews and exposés) opportunities.

Film
Film in general, as well as comedic film, continues to show the gender imbalance of other forms of comedy. In 2014, a study found that there were 2.24 male characters for every one female character. Of the movies surveyed, 30.9% of the speaking characters were female. Additionally, one of the major storylines in the film industry (the romantic comedy), consistently follows traditional female roles, women to searching for a male partner.

Social media 
Most women comedians in the US extensively use social media to produce comedy content, engage with fans, and influence their press coverage. A study in 2023 found that 92% use Instagram, 89% use Twitter, only 48% run a YouTube account, and 58% of women comedians host at least one podcast. While only 46% of women comedians make content for TikTok, the platform provided half the total digital media following for some of the most popular women comedians. This includes Colleen Ballinger, who was the most followed in 2022, with 21.5m TikTok followers compared to 23.2m subscribers on YouTube.

Gender imbalance
The gender imbalance between men and women can be found all over, even on Wikipedia. The page: list of comedians show a much higher number of males than females.

In pay
In the United States, there is a large gender gap between men and women in comedy with regards to both pay and number. In 2014, all ten of the top ten paid comedians were male, bringing in a total of $173 million. In 2016, one female entered the list: Amy Schumer, at number two.

In appearances
A study in 2017 found a large gender imbalance in UK comedic panel shows, with 31% of the appearances. However, the same study also found marked improvement since 1989, when the statistic was 3%. Additionally, the UK industry website Chortle lists 269 female comedian as compared to 1,279 male comedians.

Imbalance can also be seen at the level of the comedy club. For example, the prestigious New York comedy club Carolines featured 20% female performers to 80% male in 2014. Within the writers room, gender imbalance persists. Women made up 10 percent of writers working on the top 250 domestic grossing films of 2010 and 15 percent of writers and 18 percent of creators in prime-time television during the 2010–2011 season.

In South Korea, of 70 comedic variety shows, 13 had all male hosts and guests, and 23 with all male hosts, meaning that more than half of these shows lack female hosts. Only two shows had all females hosts and guests. Shows without hosts often try to model marriages by pairing up male and female celebrities. While this does achieve some sense of gender balance, it uses very traditional roles.

Gendering of humor
The early female figures in stand up, such as Phyllis Diller, were able to enter the mainstream through their willingness to self-deprecate and declare themselves ugly. Other early female comediennes, such as Mae West and Helen Kane, used sex appeal to attract male audiences. In other words, they were able to enter, but not on the terms of male comedians. More modern female comedians cite a need to tailor their comedy to what men would find to be funny, with change in this mentality only coming very recently.

In stand-up
Stand up comedy, in particular, is described as a masculine art form. The words that are used to describe success are often violent, such as killed or annihilated. The performer must take charge of the stage, claiming it as their own via the phallic symbol of the microphone. The structure of joke is often centered on an attack on another party. The aggression that such an art form necessitates is encouraged in males but discouraged in females.

Discrimination against women
In many societies around the world, a woman's role has affected her flexibility in comedy. In countries that historically view women as inferior to men, comedy is seen as a masculine discipline.  The common perception that women aren't funny pervades all aspects of comedy, including stand-up, television, and movies. The comedy establishment, influenced by patriarchal society, has relegated women to the "side of tears and loss." Systematic sexism can be found at the level of audience members, bookers, agents, and male comics. As a powerful social tool, comedy brings women outside of the traditional role that has been defined as theirs.

Women have experience everything from heckling audience members calling them gendered terms like bitches or sluts, to being invited to fake comedic festivals (so the organizer could have sex with the female comedian), to being introduced in roasts as the girl that "slept with one of the judges."

Feminist tool
Humor has been used a tool of feminism both for its ability to point out patriarchy and the structures it creates as well as identify the common female experience. A distinction must be made between female humor and feminist humor. Female humor is self-deprecatory, turning inwards to the performer herself. Feminist humor, by contrast, looks outwards at the societal structures that demean women. It is aggressive and pointed, using comedic language formerly reserved for men only as a tool of liberation. Feminist humor is to be an agent of change for women by drawing attention to their lowered position in society.

Bing argues that for feminist humor to be most effective at its goal of change, it should be inclusive, rather than divisive. Divisive humor, or jokes that focus on male structures or male-bashing, do not advance feminism, but rather continue to marginalize females. Inclusive humor that riffs off of the shared experience of women, can be subversive without the negative effects of divisive humor. Bing continues to say that when humor falls into this inclusive comedy it contributes to feminism by first, contradicting the age old stereotype that women cannot be funny, and second, by undermining the status quo.

Humor itself can be used to make strong structural changes in a society. Many times humor has been used to subvert hierarchical structures. For example, the Guerrilla Girls used humor to point out the patriarchal, unchanging nature of the Tony awards, which give the majority of their prizes to men. It also functions to establish an in-group (those making and understanding the joke) and an out-group (those on the receiving end). Through this process, humor can create solidarity within a group, but can also make another feel excluded. For women, this can serve to strengthen them as a community.

Representation worldwide

Bangladesh
Outside of the United States, women have been having similar experiences in their attempts to enter field of comedy, colored by their own cultural influences. One such women is Farhana Muna, a Bangladeshi Muslim comic. Her material is focused on Bangladeshi life and culture, from parties to relatives commenting on weight loss. According to Muna, she often feels constrained by what is deemed appropriate or not for a Bangladeshi Muslim women. She must watch what she says and wears. Muna reemphasized the sentiment that there is a wider range of comedy acceptable for men. She has also faced criticism for her actions, including her choice to not wear the hijab, with people calling her a bad Muslim. However, she continues her comedic work due to the community of women that she has met through it. Muna sees comedy as a collective platform of expression, a way to share her experiences in a relatable way.

India
Women have been on the rise in India's comedy as recently as 2016. In a country that has deeply entrenched patriarchal values, these female comedians face great amounts of cultural animosity. Despite this discrimination women such as Aditi Mittal and Neeti Palta have found success in an industry that did not readily accept them.

South Korea
In South Korea, female comedians do not encounter many comedic opportunities. Only two television programs are completely hosted by females, with the other major television opportunity being couples shows. South Korean TV shows only offer gender balance when women are in gendered roles. Producers see men as more advantageous hires as the shows' audiences are majority women. Additionally, there was a worry that audiences would react badly to strong women in television. As the woman's movement grows in South Korea, so too do the opportunities for women. Rather than featuring beautiful women as prizes to be won by males contestants, new shows such as Sisters' Slam Dunk (which premiered in 2016) feature women working together to solve problems.

Figures

Phyllis Diller 
One of the most prominent early figures in American female comedy, Phyllis Diller made her comedic debut at the Purple Onion Comedy Club in the 1950s. Her stand-up routines focused on the problems of the suburban housewife, a previous unaddressed area by male comics. By opening acknowledging her lack of physical attractiveness and by incorporating self-deprecation into her routines, Diller was able to enter comedy in a time when funny and attractive women were seen as threatening. However, by confining her comedy to her inability to fulfill her traditional role, she reinforced female stereotypes rather than dismissing them.

Lucille Ball 
After an early career acting on Broadway and in films, Lucille Ball became a well known comedy actor on television, starting with the hit situation comedy "I Love Lucy," which she created in 1951, with her then husband Desi Arnaz. She continued to act in other roles in television, film, and on stage later on. In 1962, she became the first woman to run a major television studio, Desilu Productions, which produced many popular television series, including Mission: Impossible and Star Trek.

Carol Burnett 
Carol Burnett started performing on stage in comedy roles in the early 1950s, while still in college. She went on to perform in numerous productions in theater, in films, and on television.  By 1967, she began hosting her own television variety show, The Carol Burnett Show, one of the first of its kind to be hosted by a woman. The show continued in production for over a decade, breaking new ground in comedic material, gaining top ratings, and earning numerous awards.

Joan Rivers
Joan Rivers (active from 1959–2014) was one of the first female comedians to utilize the "talk/conversational" method, one that was suited to television talk shows. Unlike Phyllis Diller, who was quite unlike her comedic personality, the comedy of Joan Rivers more closely reflected her personality. She often drew on her own personal experiences as a self-proclaimed Jewish princess. Unlike her predecessors, Rivers did not downplay her attractiveness, but rather incorporated it into her riffs on life as a single woman. Still, her comedy was focused on the traditional problems of a woman (trying to find a boyfriend and husband, being a good wife etc).

Jane Curtin
Jane Curtin was a part of the inaugural class of Not Ready for Prime Time Players on Saturday Night Live in 1975. On SNL, she was the anchor for Weekend Update and started in many well known skits including Coneheads. On Weekend Update, she served as the liberal counterpart to Dan Aykroyd’s conservative perspective. In 2008, when asked about the environment at Saturday Night Live, Curtin said that female writers faced an extremely difficult battle, especially when cast member like John Belushi were actively working against them. While fundamentally believing that women are not capable of humor, he also would sabotage pieces written by women. Despite this atmosphere, Jane Curtin had a very successful career at SNL and went on to work on sitcoms, Broadway, and various movies.

Elayne Boosler
Elayne Boosler was one of the few women working in stand-up comedy in the 1970s and 80s and she broke ground by adopting an observational style, that included frank discussions about her life as a single woman, as well as political commentary. Her performance style set her apart from the more self-deprecating humor of female stand-up predecessors such as Joan Rivers and Phyllis Diller, whose jokes often revolved around being a wife and mother.

Her 1985, self-produced comedy special Party of One was the first hour-long comedy special by a female comedian to appear on a cable television network. Boosler had originally approached Showtime for funding, but wound-up funding the project herself after TV executives told her that no one would watch a woman do an hour of comedy. 

Comedian Richard Lewis told The New York Times in 1984: "She is the Jackie Robinson of my generation. She is the strongest female working. She broke the mold for most female comics." Rolling Stone referred to her as "The First Lady of Stand-Up" in 1988 and included Boosler in their list of the "50 Best Stand-Up Comics of All Time" in 2017. In 2018, CNN included Boosler in their list of "Groundbreaking women in American comedy" and critic Jason Zinoman of The New York Times referred to Boosler as "The Comedy Master Who Hasn’t Gotten Her Due."

Tina Fey

Figures such as Tina Fey have paved the way in the modern era for large-scale growth in female comedy. Her public appointment as the first female head writer of Saturday Night Live placed her in a position to serve as a feminist comedy icon. Many of her sketches became iconic, particularly her satirical portrayal of Vice Presidential Candidate Sarah Palin. Her comedic writing (Mean Girls, 30 Rock, Bossypants, Baby Mama, Date Night etc...), in addition to achieving great public notice, was well received by critics.

Miranda Hart
Miranda Hart is a female comedian from the UK. She is most well-known for her television series Miranda. Her awkward and clumsy character in the show is a embodiment of all the society neuroses that women face in daily life. Such a style of comedy makes her into an everywoman. Hart herself sees a divide in comedy, with some using comedy as a tool to increase their coolness (others) and some using comedy as a tool for clowning around (her). By staying within the clowning realm of comedy, she achieved a cult following.

Amy Schumer
Amy Schumer is a female comedian from the United States, and was the highest paid entertainer in her field in 2016. She has been one of the most successful female comedians of all time, appealing to a wide audience of both men and women. Schumer is most well-known for her movie Trainwreck (2015) and her Comedy Central show, Inside Amy Schumer. In 2015, she was named one of Time Magazine's most influential people. Her comedy is often focused on gender politics, touching on the issues that women face throughout their lives. One of her most famous skits centers around women not being able to accept compliments, resulting in escalating forms of self-deprecation - culminating in mass suicide, rather than accepting the compliment.

Schumer has used her influence and time in the spotlight for a great deal of good as well. In addition to joking about gender politics in her skits, she has made more serious comments about gender norms in both advertisement campaigns and in her movies. When promoting her 2015 HBO special Schumer appeared on billboards looking rather masculine, with text next to her saying “She’s a lady,” poking fun at the expectations she is supposed to follow both with her looks and personality as a woman. Schumer has also openly been an advocate for gun control, especially after there was a fatal shooting at a showing of her movie Trainwreck.

Gina Barreca 
Gina Barreca is a female comedian from the United States, known around the world for her books. These include Babes in Boyland, I Used to be Snow White but I Drifted, If you Lean In will Men Just Look Down Your Blouse and many others. Dr. Gina Barreca has appeared on 20/20, The Today Show, CNN, the BBC, NPR and Oprah to discuss gender, power, politics, and humor.

See also
 Comedy
 Feminism
 Women in film

References

Comedy
Women in society
Feminism and the arts